Malton is a former settlement in Glenn County, California. Malton still appeared on maps as of 1917.

References

Former settlements in Glenn County, California
Former populated places in California